is a private junior college in Kurashiki, Okayama, Japan, established in 1973.

External links
 Official website 

Japanese junior colleges
Educational institutions established in 1973
Private universities and colleges in Japan
Universities and colleges in Okayama Prefecture
1973 establishments in Japan